I Am Setsuna is a 2016 role-playing video game (RPG) developed by Tokyo RPG Factory and published by parent company Square Enix for PlayStation 4, PlayStation Vita and Microsoft Windows. A version for Nintendo Switch was released in 2017 as a console launch title. The storyline, set in a snow-bound world plagued by monsters, follows silent protagonist Endir as he becomes the guardian of Setsuna, a young woman journeying to the Last Lands to act as a sacrifice for pacifying the monsters. The gameplay, which is designed to emulate RPGs from the genre's "golden age" in the 1990s, uses an Active Time Battle system blended with unique mechanics.

The debut project of Tokyo RPG Factory, I Am Setsuna began production in 2014 with a short production schedule. In keeping with the studio's goal, the team took mechanical inspiration from Chrono Trigger (1995). Using the visual theme of snow, the narrative was written to explore the theme of sadness. The music, composed by Tomoki Miyoshi, was performed almost exclusively on piano by Randy Kerber. It released to strong sales, eventually allowing the developer to make a profit, and was positively received by critics. Praise went to its atmosphere, soundtrack and gameplay, though several faulted the lack of aesthetic variety and low difficulty.

Gameplay

I Am Setsuna is a role-playing video game in which players take control of a party of characters, navigating environments from an angled top-down perspective. Locations such as towns and dungeons are reached by navigating the game's overworld. In towns, the party can talk with villagers to reveal plot elements, and find treasure chests containing useful items. Various items such as healing potions or "Fogstone" items for escaping from battle are sold in shops in towns and across the world. There are a small number of side quests tied to each of the playable characters, unlocked when all characters are recruited and triggered by having that character in the current party.

Enemies are represented on the field by icons: contact with the icons initiates a battle. Battles take place in the environments where the enemy is encountered rather than shifting to a specific battle arena. Characters' health and magic meter are respectively represented by HP and MP. Characters fight using a version of the Active Time Battle System featured in games such as entries in the Final Fantasy series: after each action is taken by a character in battle, an ATB gauge must fill again before another action is taken. Available actions include attacking with weapons; using special combat abilities or magic, which are lumped together as "Techs"; or using an item. If more than one character's ATB gauges are full, they will perform actions in the order in which instructions are issued to them.

Each character may equip "Spritnite" crystals on their gear. These crystals grant both passive bonuses and the abilities on the "Techs" menu.  Some of these Techs can synergize together into a new attack; for instance, the spinning "Cyclone" and rushing "Charge" techs can become "X-Strike," a two-person attack directed at one enemy.  If one of these "Double Techs" are available, the "Techs" menu will change to "Combo". Each time an action is taken, or a character's ATB gauge is allowed to remain full, a separate "Setsuna" gauge begins to fill.  When full, it grants a "Momentum" charge which may be expended at the player's discretion to grant power boosts to the character's actions. These boosts can include dealing multiple versions of the attack, recovering health, or dealing critical damage to an enemy.

Synopsis
I Am Setsuna is set in a snow-bound land regularly beset by angry demons. According to an ancient custom, a maiden is sacrificed in the distant Last Lands to appease the demons. The demons grow restless once again, and the girl Setsuna is chosen as the sacrifice. The story begins with the mercenary Endir accepting a mission to assassinate Setsuna. Upon arriving, Setsuna persuades him to accompany her as a guardian alongside her childhood friend Aeterna. On their journey they meet and are joined by Nidr, the guard of the earlier sacrifice and Setsuna's illegitimate father; Kir, a member of a magically-gifted tribe with truncated lifespans; and Julienne, descendant of the ancient kingdom once occupying the Last Lands. They are attacked several times by a figure called the Reaper, who is driven by a power that seeks Setsuna's death; he is eventually killed when they arrive in the Last Lands. The growing party also come across signs of the monsters' continued attacks undermining the morale of surviving human settlements.

At the heart of the Last Lands, the group are met by a woman called the Time Judge, who reveals that the sacrifices are offered to sustain a barrier that imprisons the Dark Samsara, with Aeterna being a clone that can be active beyond the Last Lands. Once a boy with high magical abilities a millennium before, the Dark Samsara was experimented on by an ancient kingdom when magic started dying out, the aim being to create an eternal source of magic. The boy lost his consciousness and became a magical being driven by rage, destroying the kingdom that occupied the Last Lands and birthing the monsters. The previous sacrifice, Setsuna's mother Mana, told the Time Judge of Setsuna's potential as one who might defeat the Dark Samsara. Whenever Setsuna instead followed through on the sacrifice, the Time Judge rewound time to repeat the cycle, though in this cycle Endir has been influencing events. The Time Judge resurrects the Reaper, who takes the name Fides, to aid them before fading away, leaving no means of rewinding time if the Dark Samsara wins.

The group finally fights and seemingly defeats the Dark Samsara, but it flees back through time to escape. To follow it, Endir and Setsuna use the traces left by their memories—the save points scattered through the world that only they can see—and follow the Dark Samsara after the others give up their magical energy to empower them. Travelling back to Setsuna's home on the day her mother left as a sacrifice, Endir defeats the Dark Samsara in its humanoid form. Setsuna then absorbs him into herself, granting the Dark Samsara access to her feelings and companionship before asking Endir to destroy her body. The ending shows Aeterna vanishing with her mission completed, and the other party members go their separate ways. A post-credits scene shows Endir walking past a broadleaf tree in leaf, with Setsuna's spirit watching over him.

Development
I Am Setsuna was developed by Tokyo RPG Factory, a studio created by Square Enix and staffed by external staff to produce role-playing video games (RPGs). At the event, it was described by Square Enix as a "pure fantasy, true role-playing video game". The game was designed as a new IP, with its future developments to be decided after Square Enix reviewed its post-launch reception and success. The concept for I Am Setsuna was written in September 2014, with development beginning the following month. The alpha build was completed by August 2015. The production schedule was noted as being fairly short. The concept originated from plans to re-create a game similar to classic RPGs from the genre's golden age. The staff was made up of developers who agreed with this vision. I Am Setsuna was developed using the Unity game engine.

In keeping with the team goals, the battle system was adopted from role-playing games like early Final Fantasy titles and other games like Chrono Trigger. According to Hashimoto, Chrono Trigger was used as inspiration due to its popularity, it being a favorite of the assembled development team, and the fact that there were few spiritual successors to it on the market. They also drew influence from Dragon Quest, The Legend of Zelda, the SaGa and Mother series, and Xenogears. The playtime was designed to be similar to SNES games of the 90s, going against the prevalent trend of added content with the scale and power of gaming technology. The traditional battle system gave the development team a "sense of security" when faced with the challenges of development the game. One of the difficult elements was balancing the game's difficulty so it could be enjoyed by both casual and hardcore gamers. The battle system was specifically based on the Active Time Battle system used in Chrono Trigger. Several staples from other RPGs, including inns and a world map, were influenced by the harsh setting and a wish to have players thinking about where to go.

A key theme running through the game is "sadness". The story's setting, in a land covered by snow, and its general tone carried this theme, alongside evoking the emotional stories of classic role-playing games. The theme also extends to its title, which stems from the word "setsunasa": while it holds a variety of meanings in Japanese, the meaning used by the production team was sadness or sorrow. "Setsuna" also translated as "a moment in time", which tied into the game's SP battle mechanic. Much of the effort in writing went into the game's language, with the team obsessing over how players would respond to different words. For this reason, they used katakana as little as possible, instead using native kanji expressions for terms like "monster". Despite lacking katakana, the setting used writing schemes akin to those from European literature, giving the world a unique feel.

The scenario was co-written by Hirotaka Inaba and Makoto Goya. The game's central themes, which focused on life and death as represented by Setsuna's sacrifice, was included as part of the callback to earlier role-playing games. One of the main features of the hero's design was his mask, which made it harder for players to fully empathize with him. During early production, Hashimoto was putting relatively little effort in the scenario expecting it not to change, but the development team disliked how the scenario was developing and insisted on a rewrite that changed half the script despite the production's time constraints. The scenario's ending was not determined from the outset, with the writing team instead writing the script as if they were on the journey themselves based on the established theme. While the team wanted to continue producing games based on the gameplay and thematic concepts, they considered I Am Setsuna to be a standalone project without any need for a sequel. No CGI scenes were included, and some elements of the story were left up to interpretation as had been done in earlier titles.

From its foundation, Tokyo RPG Factory had drawn inspiration from the Japanese phrase Setsugekka (Snow, Moon and Flowers) when choosing the visual themes for each planned game; I Am Setsuna used the theme of snow. The snowy environment was chosen to emphasise the melancholy tone of the narrative. The character designs were done by Toi8; he was brought in at an early stage, and his designs were likewise meant to reinforce the atmosphere. When translating the design into the game's 3D models, the team shortened them and gave them a distinctive appearance by removing their feet. This was possible due to the snowy environment in most areas, which would theoretically hide the feet. The game's music was composed by Tomoki Miyoshi, a young composer whose first notable score was for Soul Calibur V. Almost all tracks were performed on solo piano played by Randy Kerber, who had worked on major films including Forrest Gump and Titanic. Hashimoto wanted the score to be deeply melancholic, and able to have sharp endings to tracks and sections, something a piano was good at. The instrument was chosen within the first few minutes of Miyoshi's first meeting with the team. He also wanted an instrument that was recognized worldwide to convey the game's themes without language barriers. Miyoshi's approach to his compositions was driven by the game's narrative themes, drawing inspiration from the compositions of Joe Hisaishi.

Release
The game was first announced at the 2015 Electronic Entertainment Expo as a game for the PlayStation 4 under the title Project Setsuna. During its promotion, the team were wary of openly referencing Chrono Trigger as that might cause an excess of expectations among potential players. Its next showing was at that year's Tokyo Game Show, where its official Japanese title was revealed, alongside its release on the PlayStation Vita. Its title in Japan is Ikenie to Yuki no Setsuna, roughly translated as "Setsuna of Sacrifice and Snow". There are no differences in content between the two versions of the game, with the only exception being that the PlayStation 4 version looks better on a large screen due to resolution issues. They also wanted to enable players to have a portable version, accommodating different playstyles. As of September 2015, development was reported as 60% complete. In November of the same year, the game's Japanese release date was revealed to be February 18, 2016.

In March 2016, Square Enix announced details regarding the game's English release, including its English title, I Am Setsuna, and the fact that it would only be released on the PS4 and Microsoft Windows platforms, not on the Vita. According to Hashimoto, dropping the Vita in the West was due to a trend in Western gaming for full immersion in a gaming world. Another factor was the smaller Vita market in the West when compared to home consoles and PC gaming. Despite this decision, he said that there was still a chance for a Western Vita release if there was enough demand. The title was changed for the Western version as a direct translation of the original title would have lost language nuances relating to Setsuna's name. The game was translated and localized for the West by independent company Dico. I Am Setsuna was released internationally on July 19, 2016. The game was later announced as a worldwide launch title for the Nintendo Switch worldwide on March 3, 2017. A coliseum battle mode dubbed "Temporal Battle Arena" was released as downloadable content for the Switch version on April 13.

Reception

According to Media Create, the PlayStation 4 and PlayStation Vita versions of I Am Setsuna debuted at #6 and #7 respectively. The PlayStation 4 version sold 33,629, while the PlayStation Vita version sold 27,994, bringing total sales to roughly 66,000 units. By the following week, the Vita version had dropped out of the top 20, while the PlayStation 4 version had sold a further 6,619 units. During its first year, Tokyo RPG Factory recorded a heavy loss for its parent company, though this was not seen as unusual given its status as a new studio. By the following year, the studio had earned a substantial profit from continue sales of I Am Setsuna.

Japanese gaming magazine Famitsu gave both versions a score of 32 out of 40. Positive comments were made on the overall atmosphere, its old-school design, "tasteful" graphics, somber story, and the piano score. Points that were criticized were the lack of novelty in its design, and frequent loading times when navigating town environments. Dengeki PlayStation found the game worth its low cost, and commented positively on its serious story, character customization options, and the balance of "quality and quantity". The reviewers were less positive about other aspects, such as difficult-to-handle battle system, repetitive combat, and difficulties with buying and selling equipment. GameSpot praised the "delicate" writing, "Beautifully tragic" story, combat system, tech combos, and boss battles, but criticized "promising story beats" for feeling rushed, "too easy" common enemies, and "Random elements" disrupting combat balance. IGN said it "has some combat balance issues, but that doesn't keep it from delivering a highly emotional tale."

Notes

References

External links
 
 

2016 video games
Nintendo Switch games
PlayStation 4 games
PlayStation Vita games
Japanese role-playing video games
Role-playing video games
Single-player video games
Square Enix games
Video games developed in Japan
Windows games